Pasha of Tripoli was a title that was held by many rulers of Tripoli in Ottoman Tripolitania. The Ottoman Empire ruled the territory for most time from the Siege of Tripoli in 1551 until the Italian invasion of Libya in 1911, at the onset of the Italo-Turkish War.

List

For continuation after Italian conquest, see: List of colonial governors of Italian Tripolitania and List of colonial governors of Italian Cyrenaica

See also
Red Castle of Tripoli
Ottoman Tripolitania
Italian Libya
List of Governors-General of Italian Libya
Italian Tripolitania
List of colonial governors of Italian Tripolitania
Italian Cyrenaica
List of colonial governors of Italian Cyrenaica

References
World Statesmen – Libya

Ottoman titles
Government of the Ottoman Empire
Libya
History of Tripolitania
Libya history-related lists
Ottoman Empire-related lists